This is a list of properties and districts in Monroe County, Georgia that are listed on the National Register of Historic Places (NRHP).

Current listings

|}

References

Monroe
Buildings and structures in Monroe County, Georgia